The Challenge: Rivals II is the 24th season of the MTV reality game show The Challenge. The season took place in Phuket, Thailand, with former cast members from MTV's The Real World and The Challenge competing. The season followed the same format as the original Rivals challenge, with players paired up with arch enemies from past seasons of The Real World and The Challenge.

A launch special, "ChallengeMania: the Road to Rivals II," aired on June 26, 2013. The season premiered with a special 90 minutes episode on July 10, 2013, and concluded its run on September 25, 2013, with the live Reunion special.

This is the second of the Rivals series, with the original Rivals airing in 2011 and Rivals III following in 2016.

Contestants

Teams

Format
Rivals II follows the same format as the original Rivals challenge (click here for further information), with the following differences:

 After each challenge, the winning team whose gender is not designated for the Jungle is awarded $1,000.
 Unlike the original Rivals, the nominations process is only determined by the teams of the other gender - so only the male teams vote in for female nominations, and vice versa.
 At the end of the season, six teams will compete in the final challenge — three of each gender — for a share of a $350,000 prize. The first-place male and female teams win $125,000, second-place wins $35,000 and third-place wins $15,000.

Sources for this section:

Pre-season rivalry backgrounds
As with the original Rivals challenge, Rivals II combines individuals who have had acrimonious or at least strained relations or interactions prior to the season. The following lists all the teams on Rivals II and explains why they've been paired and dubbed as "rivals." Each of the teams' history of animosity and/or open expressions of hostility are detailed as follows:

Male teams
 CT & Wes: The bad blood between the two stems from a long-standing rivalry that started on The Duel, where Wes and Evan Starkman plotted to take out CT in the Duel. This plan backfired when CT defeated Evan in "Ascender." Tension continued to rise after CT was DQ'd in the "Push Me" Duel against Brad Fiorenza. After CT exploded calling the decision unfair, Wes stepped in to the Duel and a heated argument ensued. During the argument, CT told Wes to "tell your girlfriend [Johanna Botta] you have to put the ring on layaway" to which Wes responded, "Why don't I fake date someone just to get to the end of this shit," referring to CT's new relationship with Diem Brown. The next time they met up on a Challenge was during the original Rivals. After a cocky Wes tried to start drama, CT verbally attacked Wes while Wes did not respond. While the two were not shown fighting on Battle of the Exes, CT informed Johnny that Wes was trying to bully his partner, Camila, resulting in Johnny sending Wes and Mandi into the first Dome against Nate and Priscilla.
 Derek & Robb: After a night of drinking on Battle of the Seasons, Robb and his then-girlfriend Marie Roda were upset about getting sent into the Arena against Team Las Vegas. After Marie began insulting an innocent bystander, JD Ordoñez, Derek stepped up to defend him. After Derek began to fight back against Marie, Robb stepped up to defend her and the two men got into a huge argument. The argument got physical when Derek began pushing up against Robb which resulted in Derek getting shoved by Marie, which led to fellow castmate Sam McGinn to fall back and smash her head on a ceramic planter.
 Dunbar & Tyrie: The two had a seemingly one-sided beef in The Island, where Tyrie made several comments about Dunbar not being worthy of having a key after being given it by Abram Boise. Despite the fact that many cast members felt this way, Tyrie was the only one who came out and said this outright. Tyrie also became annoyed by Dunbar's behavior over food distribution on The Island, where Dunbar was serving himself larger portion sizes than the girls based on the fact that he is a bigger male. Even though Tyrie was just as hungry, he stated that Dunbar's behavior was annoying, and that he would liked to have "whooped Dunbar's ass" on the street. Upon finding out his partner, Dunbar stated that he never knew Tyrie disliked him. Also, Dunbar was not thrilled when he learned Tyrie was his partner, for the reason that Tyrie does not do well in these challenges.
 Frank & Johnny: While the two had never been on a Challenge together or even met, they exchanged several heated tweets to each other after Johnny ranted about not getting cast in Battle of the Seasons as well as taking exception to a "JV Squad" takeover, to which Frank responded that the Challenges "don't provide a 401K."
 Jordan & Marlon: Initially the two began their time in The Real World: Portland as friends, but Jordan's drunken antics caused Marlon to become frustrated with him. Despite Marlon not being Jordan's biggest fan, the two never fought on their own. However, the two got into an argument one morning after Jordan made a racist gesture towards African-American castmate Nia Moore. Following this incident, the two were rarely shown interacting.
 Knight & Preston: During their original season on The Real World: New Orleans (2010), Knight made some homophobic remarks about Preston, which greatly offended him. The two were then teammates on Battle of the Seasons, where they both expressed their distaste for each other. Shortly after moving into the house, Knight and ex-girlfriend Jemmye Carroll began talking about getting Preston and McKenzie Coburn off of their team, feeling that the pair was holding them back. The first time that Team New Orleans was subjected to the Arena, Knight and Jemmye got their wish, and Preston and McKenzie were eliminated by Sarah Rice and Chet Cannon in the "Balls Out" elimination.
 Leroy & Ty: The two ended up grappling the other during the original Rivals that led to Leroy's teammate Adam Royer being disqualified for punching Ty in the face. Leroy eventually got a new partner, his friend Michael Ross. In addition, Ty and his partner Emily Schromm faced-off and defeated Leroy and his partner Naomi in the Dome on Battle of the Exes.
 Trey & Zach: During Battle of the Seasons, Trey felt excluded by Zach's Team (San Diego) and their alliance. The alliance only spoke to Marie and Robb when they needed to speak with Team St. Thomas. Trey did not like the fact that Marie was the "decision maker" for their team, and that he and Laura Waller were seen as the outcasts. The one time the entire Team St. Thomas spoke with Team San Diego, Zach became frustrated with Trey while discussing why they should not put them in the elimination. After Trey stated that he was playing the game his way, Zach got up and walked away because he felt like Trey was full of it.

Female teams
 Anastasia & Jessica: Tension between the two began on their season of The Real World: Portland. They first started out friendly with each other, with both getting jobs at the same frozen yogurt stand to spend time together, but then eventually began to become annoyed with each other after Jessica felt excluded by Anastasia and their fellow castmate Averey Tressler, as well as Anastasia becoming annoyed with what she felt was Jessica's need to constantly draw attention to herself. Anastasia admitted in a confessional that she was extremely annoyed with Jessica's controlling behavior and wanted to get away from her, and later sat down with Jessica to express her dislike of her. However, during a physical altercation between roommates Averey Tressler, Johnny Reilly and Nia Moore, Anastasia and Jessica squashed their differences.
 Aneesa & Diem: Their beef stems from their time on The Duel. During the second to last challenge, Around the Block, Aneesa mentioned to Diem that she would not call her into the Duel (under the false assumption that Diem would win that day's safety). After Jodi Weatherton won the challenge, Aneesa was left to decide between Diem, and her best friend Svetlana Shusterman. Aneesa chose Diem and the pair would face off in the I Can Duel, the one Duel Diem did not want because she did not feel it was fair to both competitors. After Diem got careless with her betting, Aneesa made her attempt to lift 150 coffee bags, and after she could not budge them, Diem was eliminated in tears. Following the loss, Aneesa went over to Diem to give her a hug goodbye, and Diem told her that she was not in the mood for that because she was the one who called her into the Duel.
 Camila & Jemmye: Following the altercations between Ryan Knight and Nany González on Battle of the Seasons, Camila got into a heated argument with Knight on a charter bus ride home from a nightclub, after defending Nany. Despite no longer being Knight's girlfriend, Jemmye quickly came to his aid and excoriated Camila on the bus to the point where the two almost got physical with one another. The two were walked into the house separately by other cast members, while still fuming about the incident on the bus.
 Cooke & Naomi: Following Adam Royer's eviction form the Hard Rock Hotel and Casino on The Real World: Las Vegas (2011), Cooke filled his spot in the cast. Naomi was the main cast member trying to band everyone against Cooke, leading to the latter to becoming an outcast for the majority of her stay in Las Vegas. Eventually Cooke had set her sights on Naomi's on-off bedmate Leroy Garrett, leading to an argument where Naomi got in Cooke's face.
 Cara Maria & Cooke: Cara Maria replaces Naomi in episode 2. Although they have never appeared on a season together, Cooke mentioned Cara Maria tweeting "not-so-nice" things to Cooke.
 Emily & Paula: The two faced off against each other in the physical Pole Me Over Gulag on Cutthroat, where Emily overwhelmed and defeated Paula, and prevented her from making it to the finale which would later be won by Paula's Red Team. However, the real tension between the two began on Battle of the Exes, when Emily held a grudge against Paula for sending her into the Dome against Leroy Garrett & Naomi Defensor. Following the revelation that they would be going into the Dome, Emily claimed that Paula was only sending her in because she was afraid. To that, Paula joked in a confessional, "She is correct. Yes ma'am, Have you seen you?" Emily also became discontent with Paula's flirtation with Ty, which Emily felt was interfering with her relationship with Ty. Later, Emily and Camila mocked Paula and Ty with an unintentionally racist practical joke, in which Emily appeared in blackface by smearing Nutella on her face, and Camila mocked Paula. Eventually, they faced off in the physical "Hall Pass" elimination, with their partners Dunbar Merrill and Ty Ruff where Emily and Ty dominated their respective heats.
 Jasmine & Theresa: The two got into an explosive argument during the original Rivals challenge, after their respective partners, Jonna Mannion and Camila Nakagawa, got into an argument. Camila was offended by Jonna trash-talking about her, and Jonna was offended by the fact that she did not know the difference between her and Jasmine. Both Jasmine and Theresa came to their partners' defense and eventually got into each other's faces. Jasmine had to be pulled from the room by Sarah Rice, with Sarah telling her that she did not want to go out like Adam [Royer] did. Jasmine had screamed that she was "going to fuck [Theresa] up," before punching a nearby mirror and shattering it. Ironically, the next morning Jasmine made a comment to Jonna that if they ever made a Rivals II, she knew who her partner would be (Theresa).
 Jonna & Nany: During the Battle of the Seasons reunion, Nany questioned Zach for his hostile behavior during the season, including assisting Knight in throwing Nany's clothes into the pool, as well as Zach's mean tweets post-season. Zach stated they occurred at retaliation partly because he felt that Nany bullied people, including, Zach's then-girlfriend, Jonna, during the Challenge. Jonna then stated that she felt Nany was not very nice to her during the Challenge. Both had bonded before the season, but due to Nany's attitude on the show, Jonna did not stick up for Nany when she accosted by Zach and others since Jonna was in a relationship with Zach, damaging their bond. In addition, Nany felt she could not trust the alliance with Jonna's team over the course of the season and departed it. After Jasmine volunteered to go into the Hall Brawl Arena in place of Jonna, whom Christian "CJ" Koegel initially wanted to be his partner, Nany voiced how she felt about Jonna. Nany told Sarah and Trishelle that Jonna was just "sleeping her way to the top (in reference to her relationship/alliance with Zach)," instead of stepping up and earning her spot in the competition.
 Sarah & Trishelle: Tension between the two began on Battle of the Seasons, when Trishelle became suspicious of Sarah's intentions when Sarah was flirting with Trishelle's teammate Alton Williams. After Team Las Vegas won a mission, they were considering putting Team Brooklyn into the Arena. Trishelle had a conversation with Sarah's teammate Devyn Simone, telling her that Sarah is the only reason her team wished to send Brooklyn into the Arena. This would later lead to a confrontation between Sarah and Trishelle, in which Trishelle told Sarah that prior to returning to the Challenges multiple cast members informed her of how manipulative Sarah can be and she said that she could not trust Sarah at all.

Gameplay

Challenge games
 Game of Inches: Much like Catch and Release from the original Rivals, one partner stands on a platform suspended 30 feet above the water, while the other dangles over the water. When T. J. Lavin blows the horn, the player on the platform must run and jump into the arms of the dangling partner, and hold onto them for 15 seconds. Those that fall are disqualified. This is performed in heats, and in each successive heat, the platform is pulled back by one foot. The last male and female teams to remain win the challenge, while the first male team to have one partner fall in the water goes straight to the Jungle.
 Winners: Zach & Trey and Emily & Paula
 XXX Games This game is played on an obstacle course along the beach, with two sections. In the first section, each team must saw off a log, with the saw placed in between the legs of each partner, and use a "thrusting" motion in order to saw the log. The first team to saw off their designated log will earn a five-second headstart for the next section, while each successive team earns a one-second headstart. The second section is "Ball Gag," in which partners are attached at their torsos, and with one player upside down, each team must advance through a pile of tires and under a log, then one player has to retrieve a red ball perched atop a wooden pole with their mouths, then drop the ball on the sand, and have their partner deposit the ball into a trap door. The first teams to deposit the ball into their designated trap door win the challenge, while the last-place female team goes straight to the Jungle.
 Winners: Emily & Paula and Trey & Zach
 Disqualified: Knight & Preston and CT & Wes
 Mind Over Splatter: Each team has to climb onto a rope ladder to a platform that is suspended 30 feet above water, then advance on a pair of 100-foot ropes over the water to a deck, and ring a bell. If a player falls into the water, that player can swim back to the starting line, however, a team is disqualified if they are unable to complete the challenge within a ten-minute time limit. The teams that make it to the deck and ring the bell in the fastest time wins, while the last-place male team goes straight to the Jungle.
 Winners: Frank & Johnny and Emily & Paula
 Disqualified: Knight & Preston
 Stumped: Each team has to advance through a maze in the sand consisting of numerous bamboo poles, with each partner tied together by their wrists to a 25-foot bamboo pole. A team is disqualified if they do not make it to the other side of the course within a 20-minute time limit. The teams that make it to the end of the obstacle course in the fastest time wins, while the last-place female team goes straight to the Jungle.
 Winners: Emily & Paula and Jordan & Marlon
 Disqualified: Jasmine & Theresa and Knight & Preston
 Frog Smash: Each team has to advance from one end of a narrow 60-foot beam to the other that is suspended 30 feet above water. Eight swings are attached from a nearby platform with the opposing teams sitting on them, where they try to knock each partner off the beam and into the water. If one partner falls into the water, the other partner can still advance to the other side of the beam. Teammates advancing on the beam have to stay within two swings of each other in order to avoid a penalty. The team whose partners advance to the end of the beam in the fastest time wins, while the last-place male team goes straight to the Jungle.
 Winners: CT & Wes and Jasmine & Theresa
 Frenemies: One partner is hanging from a platform suspended 30 feet above water, who had already been privately asked a series of questions about their partner prior to the start of the challenge. T. J. Lavin then asks the other partners the same series of questions. If the answers do not coincide, the pair is accessed one strike against them, the teammate hanging from the platform is dropped into the water on the second strike. For the women, the team whose partner is the first to hit the water is automatically sent to the Jungle. The last player hanging wins the challenge for their team, with the last female team standing winning immunity from the Jungle.
 Winners: Emily & Paula and Leroy & Ty
 Blind Leading the Blind: Each team has to advance through a maze consisting of bamboo poles, with each partner having their wrists tied together, blindfolded and wearing electrical-shock dog collars. Each team member has to endure electrical shocks throughout the maze, and a team is disqualified if they do not make it to the end of the maze within a 30-minute time limit. The team that makes it to the end of the maze in the fastest time wins, with the fastest male team winning immunity from the Jungle and the last-place male team automatically sent to the Jungle. 
 Winners: Frank & Johnny and Aneesa & Diem
 Disqualified: Jonna & Nany
 Swingers: Each team has to swing from a trapeze suspended 40 feet above water toward a catch bar, drop into the water, then each partner has to swim toward and around a midway buoy, and back toward another buoy at the finish line. The team that makes it to the finish line in the fastest time wins, with the fastest female team winning immunity from the Jungle and the last-place female team automatically sent to the Jungle.
 Winners: Camila & Jemmye and CT & Wes
 Disqualified: Jordan & Marlon  and Knight & Preston
 Rampage: Four ramps are perpendicularly linked over a pond. Each partner has to grab a ball, run down a ramp, and deposit a ball into a basket at the end of the opposite ramp across from their designated ramp. Two teams compete a time, with a total of 20 balls. The team that deposits the most balls into their designated basket within a three-minute time limit wins, with the fastest male team winning immunity from the Jungle and a guaranteed guys spot in the final challenge, while the last-place male team automatically sent to the Jungle.
 Winners: CT & Wes and Emily & Paula
 Color Correction: Teams have to race on a trail along the beach, and memorize a sequence of colors (red, yellow, green and blue) from a blinking light panel that is located one mile from the starting line. Partners are chained to each other, and after memorizing the color sequence, each team races back to the starting line, and stacks circular plates on a pole that are of different colors. Each team has to stack colored plates in the order of which they flashed on the light panel. The challenge is played in two rounds, and the two teams that correctly stack their plates in the fastest time advance to the winner's round, while the two slowest teams are out, with the slowest team automatically sent to the Jungle. In the winners' round, the team that wins the second round wins immunity from the Jungle and a guaranteed girls spot in the final challenge.
 Winners: Cara Maria & Cooke

Jungle games
Last Chance: Much like Hall Brawl from Battle of the Seasons, players must run through a narrow hallway past another contestant to ring a bell. Both teams have one offensive player and one defensive player. The offensive player who gets past the defensive player and rings the bell first in two out of three heats, wins the elimination.
Played by: Derek & Robb vs. Dunbar & Tyrie and Leroy & Ty vs. Jordan & Marlon
Hanging by a Thread: Both teams are suspended upside down from a swing, and must use tiny saws to cut through a rope that is connected to the opposing team's swing. The first team to cut the rope and dunk their opponents in the water below wins the elimination.
Played by: Cara Maria & Cooke vs. Anastasia & Jessica and Aneesa & Diem vs. Camila & Jemmye
Snapper: Played within a large circle, one player from each team has to swing and break a wooden stick at their opponent, while blindfolded. The blindfolded players wear bells on their shoes and are guided by their partners, who are standing outside of the circle. The team that breaks a stick on their opponent in two out of three heats wins the elimination.
Played by: Knight & Preston vs. Derek & Robb and Cara Maria & Cooke vs. Jonna & Nany
Who Can Take It?: One player from each team is strapped to a metal gurney. T. J. Lavin then releases 400,000 mega watts to the gurney. The player who says they cannot handle it loses their round. The team who wins two rounds out of three wins.Breaking on Through: Two three-story towers are placed in the center of the Jungle — one for each team. Each team has to open trap doors and "break through" each floor below using metal tools. Once a team has made it to ground level, each team has to "break through" a steel door, and ring a bell on the other side of the door. Each partner has to alternate breaking through each floor in order to avoid disqualification. The first team to properly break through each floor and ring a bell wins.
Played by: Leroy & Ty vs. Trey & Zach and Jordan & Marlon vs. Knight & PrestonCatch-22: Both team members run on a treadmill across from each other, behind a mud pit. Then they toss twenty-two balls over a net and to their partner who dunks the balls in a basket. The treadmills move faster as the elimination round progresses, and a team loses a round if one partner falls from the treadmill. The team with the most balls in their basket two out of three times wins the elimination.
Played by: Camila & Jemmye vs. Jasmine & TheresaFinal challenge
The first part of the final challenge begins with the remaining six teams swimming one mile in the middle of the ocean to "Dream Island", where each team has to solve three geometric puzzles — a square, a cube and a cross. Prior to the start of the final challenge, T. J. Lavin explains to each team that there is only room for four teams — two of each gender — on the super yacht. To get to the yacht, each team will have a 60-minute time limit to build replicas of the aforementioned shapes with oversize blocks that match each team's designated diagrams, retrieve a key to a kayak, and paddle their way to the yacht. If a team does not solve their designated puzzle within a 60-minute limit, they are permitted to retrieve a key to a kayak, provided that the other competing teams do not correctly solve their puzzles beforehand. The third-place finishers of each gender are eliminated from the remainder of the final challenge, and win $15,000, while the top two teams of each gender advance to the next phase of the final challenge.

The second part of the final challenge begins with the remaining four teams that made it to the super yacht swimming their way to "Nightmare Island", where each team has to retrieve a golden elephant by earning an idol at five separate checkpoints. At the first checkpoint, each team must remove 14 out of 15 spikes (with voodoo doll heads) on a large, triangular peg board, by jumping over each spike only once. After a team completes a checkpoint, that team must signal the completion of their checkpoint by pulling the pin on a smoke grenade and dropping it in a bucket. The second checkpoint is "What's Mine Is Yours", in which each team must cut through a chain-link fence with a pair of dykes, then solve a mathematical puzzle involving a Pythagorean theorem in order to determine the hypotenuse of a triangle. Each team then has to cut one of five colored ropes that corresponds to a correct answer. If a team makes an incorrect answer, all five ropes have to be cut before they are allowed to continue to the next checkpoint. At the third checkpoint "Food Test", each team must eat and drink a variety of disgusting foods and liquids from numbered receptacles, and in numerical order. A key is located at the bottom of the final jar, which will unlock a cabinet containing an idol. At the fourth checkpoint, "Body Issues", each team must move 20 body bags from one side of a course to another. After each body bag has been removed, a sign at the bottom of the pile instructs each team to dig into the ground and retrieve a treasure chest that contains the fourth idol. At the fifth and final checkpoint, "Tunnel Vision", each team must dig a tunnel that leads underneath a cage consisting of bamboo poles, with the final idol located inside the cage. The first team of each gender to retrieve all five idols and the golden elephant, make their way towards the beach, where they use a canoe to reach a yacht, wins $125,000.
 The Challenge: Rivals II Winners: CT & Wes and Emily & Paula Second-place: Frank & Johnny and Cara Maria & Cooke Third-place: Jordan & Marlon and Camila & JemmyeGame summary

Elimination chart

Jungle progress

Competition
 The team won the competition
 The team finished second in the final challenge
 The team finished in third place, after being eliminated on Day 1 of the final challenge
 The team won the challenge, and was safe from the Jungle
 The team won the challenge and $1,000
 The team was not selected for the Jungle
 The team was selected for the Jungle, but did not have to compete
 The team won in the Jungle
 The team lost in the Jungle and was eliminated
 The team was disqualified in the Jungle and was eliminated
 A contestant withdrew from the competition, but one partner later received a replacement teammate
 A contestant withdrew from the competition, and his/her partner was also eliminated

Voting history

Episodes

Reunion specialThe Challenge: Rivals II Reunion'' was aired live after the season finale on September 25, 2013, and was hosted by Jonny Moseley. The cast members who attended the reunion were: Wes, CT, Paula, Emily, Cara Maria, Diem, Aneesa, Frank, Johnny, Knight, Preston, Jemmye, Camila, Jordan and Marlon

Knight was removed after getting into a altercation with Frank over comments Frank made about Jemmye.

Notes

References

External links
 

Rivals II
2013 American television seasons
Television shows set in Thailand
Television shows filmed in Thailand